The Misfit of Demon King Academy: History's Strongest Demon King Reincarnates and Goes to School with His Descendants is an anime series based on the light novels series of the same title written by Shu and illustrated by Yoshinori Shizuma. The adaptation was announced at the "Dengeki Bunko Aki no Namahōsō Festival" event on October 6, 2019. The anime was originally set to premiere in April 2020, but it was delayed until July 2020 due to production complications resulting from the COVID-19 pandemic. The series was animated by Silver Link and directed by Masafumi Tamura, with Shin Oonuma serving as chief director. Jin Tanaka handled the series composition, while Kazuyuki Yamayoshi designed the characters, and Keiji Inai composed the music. The 13-episode anime aired from July 4 to September 26, 2020. Civilian performed the opening theme , while Tomori Kusunoki performed the ending theme . Crunchyroll streamed the series. On September 4, 2020, Aniplex of America announced that the series would receive an English dub, which premiered the following day.


Episode list

Notes

References

External links
  
  
 

2020 Japanese television seasons
Misfit of Demon King Academy (season 1)